Sara Aghai (born October 20, 1994 in New West, Canada) is a Canadian ice dancer who represented Finland with partner Jussiville Partanen. Together, they are the 2012 Finnish junior champions. They teamed up in 2011.

Programs 
(with Partanen)

Competitive highlights

With Partanen for Finland

With Dalmer for Canada

References

External links 

 

Canadian female ice dancers
Finnish female ice dancers
1994 births
Living people